Don't Try This at Home is the second album by American jazz saxophonist Michael Brecker, that was released on Impulse! records in 1988. In 1989, the album won a Grammy Award for Best Improvised Jazz Solo.

Reception
Allmusic awarded the album with 4.5 stars and its review by Scott Yanow states: "Brecker (on tenor and the EWI) is in superb form, really ripping into the eight pieces (mostly group originals). Recommended."

Track listing
 "Itsbynne Reel" (Michael Brecker, Don Grolnick) – 7:41 
 "Chime This" (Grolnick) – 7:50
 "Scriabin" (Vince Mendoza) – 7:47
 "Suspone" (Mike Stern) – 4:59
 "Don't Try This at Home" (Brecker, Grolnick) – 9:30
 "Everything Happens When You're Gone" (Brecker) – 7:11
 "Talking to Myself" (Grolnick) – 5:10
 "The Gentleman & Hizcaine" (Jim Beard) – 5:19

Personnel
 Michael Brecker – tenor saxophone, EWI (on tracks 1, 4, 5)
 Mike Stern – guitar (1, 2, 4, 5, 7, 8)
 Don Grolnick – piano (1, 2, 7)
 Herbie Hancock – piano (3, 5)
 Joey Calderazzo – piano (4, 6)
 Jim Beard – synthesizer (7, 8), piano (8)  
 Mark O'Connor – violin (1)
 Charlie Haden – bass (1-3, 5, 6)
 Jeff Andrews – fretless electric bass (1, 4, 7, 8) 
 Jack DeJohnette – drums (1, 3, 5, 8)
 Adam Nussbaum – drums (2, 4, 6)
 Peter Erskine – drums (7)
 Judd Miller – synthesizer programming (5)
Production
 Don Grolnick – producer
 James Farber – recording and mix
 Gary Solomon, Karen Robben – assistant recording engineers
 Rhonda Schoen – editing
 Ricky Schultz – executive producer
 Kathleen Covert – art direction, design
 Mark Seliger – photography
 George Varga – liner notes

References

1988 albums
Michael Brecker albums
Impulse! Records albums